Albertian Institute of Management (AIM) is in the city of Kochi, in state of Kerala, India. It is the management department of St. Albert's College (Autonomous), owned and managed by the Archdiocese of Verapoly.

The college is accredited with ‘A’ grade by NAAC and ISO 9001 – 2015 certified by TUV Rheinland approved by AICTE, New Delhi. AIM offers full time Masters Program in Management (MBA) that lays the foundation for an in-depth analytical and conceptual understanding of Indian and International Business.

History
The Archdiocese of Verapoly is known for its strong commitments in field of education, particularly higher education. The Archdiocese established St. Albert's Group of Education Institutions by starting St. Albert's School in 1892 on land donated by Kochi Maharaja. The school was the first private school for boys in  the Kingdom of Kochi at that time. Soon several other institutions were founded by the Archdiocese. In 1946, the reigning Archbishop of Kochi, Dr Joseph Attippetty, who was the first Indian Archbishop of the Archdiocese of Verapoly, decided to upgrade the High school to a full-fledged college, by starting St. Albert's College, which temporarily functioned in the Boys school campus. In 1950, the campus of the college was shifted to land opposite and St. Albert's boys school remained in its original campus with increased facilities. The original school campus was designed in Grand Victorian architecture in traditional Gothic style. A second structure resembling the original structure was commissioned in 1958 near to the old campus in addition to Pagoda styled buildings for lower classes behind the heritage structure. St. Albert's Group grew with more than 20 schools and 5 higher colleges along with a medical college and nursing home.

In 2005, as part of increasing business developments in Kochi and Kerala as a whole, St. Albert's college started a Business school. The old campus of St. Albert's boys school was fully converted to accommodate business students. The campus was opened on 17 August 2006.

Programmes
Albertian Institute of Management offers a two-year full time MBA programme spread over four semesters and two summer internships. AIM offers specialisations in the areas of Finance, Information Systems, Human Resource and Marketing to their students. The first semester course lays the foundation in fundamentals of management, the second semester lays the foundation in the functional areas of management. The third and fourth semesters focuses on in depth knowledge in the areas of specialization selected by the student. Students of AIM has to undergo two summer internship project, a one-month study (post second semester) based in an organization for comprehensive understanding of the management concepts and a two-month internship (post fourth semester) in a company based on their specialization which includes a problem-based study and analysis.

The college also offers two-year long Masters in Business Administration in Advanced Corporate finance, as an additional add-on specialised degree to regular MBA programme.

In addition, the school has a managerial research centre and centre for finance training.

Clubs
AIM-Kochi has four major clubs to organise its management students in developing specialised interests. The clubs are namely, ED Club (Entrepreneur Development), HR Club, Finance Club and Economics Times Club.

In addition all students are student members of Kerala Management Association, National Institute of Personnel Management as well as Businessline committee, to foster healthy interactions with leading corporate leaders.

The school also has two organisations for promotion of various cultural and non-academic activities. The students government is vested with Albertian Students Forum with an elected president, whereas Alumni students have its forum known as Gurukul@AIM to keep in touch with Alma Mater activities.

Awards 
The College has been accorded the following Awards

 Bestowed with the “Emerging B-School Award” by Federation of Indian Chamber of Commerce and Industries (FICCI) during the Made in Kerala Awards 2022 (Award was handed over by the Minister of Industries Law and Cir, Shri. P. Rajeev)
 Bestowed as the “First Filament Free B-School” in the State of Kerala (Award was handed over by the then Minister of Power Shri. M. M. Mani)
 Bestowed as “the best industry Aligned B-School” awarded by the Governor of Goa, His Excellency Shri. P. S. Sreedharan Pillai
 Ministry of Education, Government of India bestowed the title of “Promising Institute” during the recently concluded ARIIA Rankings 
 Bestowed as “Top and Outstanding B-School” in the State of Kerala (Award was given by the BeginUp Research Intelligence Pvt. Ltd.)
 Ranked 129th Best B-School in the Country by the Week magazine
 Ranked among the top 100 Best B-School in the Country (Private) by the Week magazine
 Ranked among the top 150 Best B-School in the Country by Business Standard
 NAAC "A Grade Accredited Institution"

References

2006 establishments in Kerala
Educational institutions established in 2006
Universities and colleges in Kochi
Colleges affiliated to Mahatma Gandhi University, Kerala
Business schools in Kerala
Christian universities and colleges in India